The yellow-shouldered grosbeak (Parkerthraustes humeralis) is a species of bird in the tanager family Thraupidae. It is the only member of its genus Parkerthraustes.
It is found in Bolivia, Brazil, Colombia, Ecuador, and Peru.
Its natural habitat is subtropical or tropical moist lowland forests.

Taxonomy
The yellow-shouldered grosbeak was formally described in 1867 by the American amateur ornithologist George Newbold Lawrence. He coined the Latin name Pytilus (Caryothrautes) humeralis. The species was moved to its own genus Parkerthraustes in 1997 by James Van Remsen Jr. The genus name was chosen to honour the memory of the American ornithologist Theodore A. Parker III who had died in an airplane accident. The specific epithet humeralis is Late Latin meaning "of the shoulders".

The yellow-shouldered grosbeak was traditionally considered a member of the cardinal family Cardinalidae. It was moved to the tanager family based on the results of a molecular phylogenetic study published in 2007. It is placed in the subfamily Orchesticinae with the brown tanager in its own genus Orchesticus. The species is monotypic: no subspecies are recognised.

References

yellow-shouldered grosbeak
Birds of the Amazon Basin
Birds of the Ecuadorian Amazon
Birds of the Peruvian Amazon
Birds of the Bolivian Amazon
yellow-shouldered grosbeak
Taxa named by George Newbold Lawrence
Taxonomy articles created by Polbot